The Rural Municipality of Hazelwood No. 94 is a rural municipality (RM) in the Canadian province of Saskatchewan within Census Division No. 1 and  Division No. 1. It is located in the southeast portion of the province.

History 
The RM of Hazelwood No. 94 incorporated as a rural municipality on January 1, 1913.

Heritage properties
There is one historical property located within the RM.
Bekevar Hungarian Presbyterian Church - Constructed in 1911, and located within Bekevar, Saskatchewan.

Geography 
Moose Mountain Provincial Park is located within the RM.

Demographics 

Economy 
Its major industry is agriculture.

Government 
The RM of Hazelwood No. 94 is governed by an elected municipal council and an appointed administrator that meets on the second Thursday of every month. The reeve of the RM is James Husband while its administrator is Gary Vargo. The RM's office is located in Kipling.

References 

H
Division No. 1, Saskatchewan